Jan-Hein Kuijpers (born 27 October 1968) is a Dutch lawyer and columnist.

Jan-Hein Kuijpers was born in Waalwijk. Together with Arthur van der Biezen he runs the law firm Kuijpers & van der Biezen Advocaten in 's-Hertogenbosch. Since 19 February 2007, he has defended Willem Holleeder, after Bram Moszkowicz stepped down as counsellor of Willem Holleeder. Piet-Hein Kuijpers also writes columns for the Dutch magazine Aktueel.

References

External links
Kuijpers & Nillesen advocaten

1968 births
Living people
Dutch columnists
20th-century Dutch lawyers
People from Waalwijk
21st-century Dutch lawyers